California's 43rd State Assembly district is one of 80 California State Assembly districts. It is currently represented by Democrat Laura Friedman of Glendale.

District profile 
The district encompasses the far eastern end of the San Fernando Valley, with portions jutting northward into the San Gabriel Mountains and southward into Central Los Angeles. 

Los Angeles County – 4.8%
 Burbank
 Glendale
 La Cañada Flintridge
 La Crescenta-Montrose
 Los Angeles – 3.5%
 Hollywood Hills – partial
 East Hollywood – partial
 Little Armenia
 Los Feliz
 Silver Lake – partial
 Atwater Village

Election results from statewide races

List of Assembly Members 
Due to redistricting, the 43rd district has been moved around different parts of the state. The current iteration resulted from the 2011 redistricting by the California Citizens Redistricting Commission.

Election results 1992 - present

2020

2018

2016

2014

2012

2010

2010 (special)

2008

2006

2004

2002

2000

1998

1996

1994

1994 (special)

1992

See also 
 California State Assembly
 California State Assembly districts
 Districts in California

References

External links 
 District map from the California Citizens Redistricting Commission

43
Government of Los Angeles County, California
Government of Los Angeles
San Fernando Valley
Atwater Village, Los Angeles
Burbank, California
Crescenta Valley
East Hollywood, Los Angeles
Glendale, California
Hollywood Hills
La Cañada Flintridge, California
Los Angeles River
Los Feliz, Los Angeles
San Gabriel Mountains
Santa Monica Mountains
Silver Lake, Los Angeles
Verdugo Mountains